Capitol Avenue Historic District is a national historic district located at Jefferson City, Cole County, Missouri.  It encompasses 107 contributing buildings in a predominantly residential section of Jefferson City. The district developed between about 1870 and 1947, and includes representative examples of Classical Revival, Late Victorian, Bungalow / American Craftsman, and Art Deco style architecture. Located in the district are the separately listed Lester S. and Missouri "Zue" Gordon Parker House, Jefferson Female Seminary, Missouri State Penitentiary Warden's House, and Ivy Terrace.  Other notable buildings include the Parsons House (1830), former Missouri Baptist Building (1947), Grace Episcopal Church (1898), Elizabeth Alien Ewing House (1873), James A. Houchin House (1900, 1910), J. Henry Asel, Sr. and Hilda Asel House (1898), Dix Apartments (1915), W.C. Young House (c. 1873), Bella Vista Apartments (1928), and Prince Edward Apartments (1930).

It was listed on the National Register of Historic Places in 2002.

References

Historic districts on the National Register of Historic Places in Missouri
Neoclassical architecture in Missouri
Victorian architecture in Missouri
Bungalow architecture in Missouri
Art Deco architecture in Missouri
Buildings and structures in Cole County, Missouri
Buildings and structures in Jefferson City, Missouri
National Register of Historic Places in Cole County, Missouri